Abdesalam Kames is a Libyan football attacker.  he played for Al Olympic Zaouia.

Career
Kames was a member of the Libyan 2006 African Nations Cup team, which finished bottom of its group in the first round of competition, thus failing to secure qualification for the quarter-finals. He was the squad's only goalscorer in the competition.

Clubs
 Al Olympic Zaouia

External links

Year of birth missing (living people)
Living people
Libyan footballers
Libya international footballers
2006 Africa Cup of Nations players
Association football forwards
Olympic Azzaweya SC players
Libyan Premier League players